Roger Rye (died 1425), of Canterbury and Eythorne, near Dover, Kent, was an English politician.

Family
Before June 1414, he married a woman named Margery. He is thought to have come originally from Dover.

Career
Rye was a Member of Parliament for Kent in 1417.

References

Year of birth missing
1425 deaths
14th-century births
English MPs 1417
People from Eythorne
People from Canterbury